Rolf Svensson (born 29 June 1935) is a Swedish archer. He competed at the 1972 Summer Olympics, the 1976 Summer Olympics and the 1980 Summer Olympics.

References

1935 births
Living people
Swedish male archers
Olympic archers of Sweden
Archers at the 1972 Summer Olympics
Archers at the 1976 Summer Olympics
Archers at the 1980 Summer Olympics
Sportspeople from Stockholm
20th-century Swedish people
21st-century Swedish people